Mesorhizobium shangrilense is a gram-negative, aerobic, non-spore-forming bacterium from the genus Mesorhizobium which was isolated from root nodules of Caragana bicolor which were found in Deqin City in the Yunnan Province in China.

References

External links
Type strain of Mesorhizobium shangrilense at BacDive -  the Bacterial Diversity Metadatabase

Phyllobacteriaceae
Bacteria described in 2009